The Simpsons Sing the Blues is the first album released as an offshoot of The Simpsons. The album contains originally recorded music not featured in the series save for the first verse of the track "Moaning Lisa Blues" which was first featured in the episode "Moaning Lisa", which aired in the United States on February 11, 1990. The album was released on December 4, 1990, and peaked at No. 3 on the Billboard 200.

An early musical number, "Do the Bartman", leads the album as the first track and the first single released. It was an international success, including being the United Kingdom number one single on February 16, 1991, staying there for a further two weeks being certified gold after selling over 400,000 copies. The second single released, "Deep, Deep Trouble" also did well in the UK, reaching number 7. "Do the Bartman" and "Deep, Deep Trouble" were released as music videos in 1990 and 1991.

Different cast members lent their voices to the album with both new material and cover songs. There were a number of notable musicians who appeared on the album, including B.B. King, DJ Jazzy Jeff, Dr. John, and Marcy Levy.

Background
David Geffen, founder of Geffen Records, had the idea to record an album based on The Simpsons, to be released in time for Christmas 1990. According to series creator Matt Groening, "James L. Brooks walked into the office one day and said 'The Simpsons Sing The Blues'...Then we spent a lot of time deciding what the blues was...". The writers wrote humorous lyrics for the actors to perform over blues and hip hop. The voice actors for the series recorded the album in September 1990. The album was difficult to produce in between production for the second season of The Simpsons, which was due to premiere just two weeks later. The album's title was penned by producer James L. Brooks. "We plundered a number of different styles for the record", admitted creator Matt Groening in a 1990 interview. The disc contains an eclectic mix of old blues tunes such as Billie Holiday's "God Bless the Child" and original songs such as "Deep, Deep Trouble", which was produced by DJ Jazzy Jeff and written by Groening. Noticing how Bart had been embraced by the African-American  communities of America, Matt Groening sought to write Bart a hip hop number.

By September 28, 1990, the vocal cast had been recording for around a month, and had completed two rough cuts of songs in between recording for the TV show. At this point, the album was due out in November. Fox had ordered around a dozen camera crews to interview and tape the voice cast, though instead of recording tracks the actors mostly pretended to sing for the cameras.

Release
The album faced great publicity before its release, with several details leaking out. Fox attempted to keep the record under wraps until negotiations with performers such as Michael Jackson were nailed down. One particular element that was highly publicized was Jackson's involvement, which was denied around the time of the album's release. "Oh, it's so frustrating," lamented Groening in a 1990 interview. "I said to a reporter a while ago that I would like to have this happen and it was printed as if it was true." Early published reports attributed Jackson as the composer of "Do the Bartman", which led to James L. Brooks issuing a press release apologizing for any misunderstanding about who actually wrote the song, instead revealing that Bryan Loren wrote the song. Fox also organized a media event around the album, pulling in nearly a half-dozen camera crews to interview and tape the would-be recording stars in action.

The Simpsons Sing the Blues was released on December 4, 1990, and was a success, peaking at No. 3 on the Billboard 200, making it the highest charting Simpsons album. The album was also a success in the United Kingdom, where it peaked at #6 on the albums chart and was eventually certified gold. The lead single from the album, "Do the Bartman", was released on November 20, 1990, followed by the unveiling of animated music video after the Simpsons episode "Bart the Daredevil" on December 6. After the Fox network premiere, the video was exclusive to MTV. The song wasn't actually released as a physical single in the US, which perhaps helped sales of the album. The music video for "Deep, Deep Trouble" debuted after "Bart's Dog Gets an "F" on March 7, 1991.

On December 14, 1990, the album was certified platinum, having sold over 1 million copies in its first week of release. Within a matter of weeks, the record was certified double platinum by the Recording Industry Association of America, on February 13, 1991, for sales of over 2 million copies.

On July 22, 2013 the album was certified Gold by the British Phonographic Industry in the UK.

Reception

The New York Times placed the album on their list of worst albums of the year in 1990, stating that "The television series was at least mildly subversive, not to mention funny; the album mangles old songs and takes no chances with bland new ones" People described it as a "slick, supercommercial novelty act", and that it seemed the producer's main goal was money rather than comedy or drama. Florida Flambeau expressed relief that the album wasn't a Christmas record, though felt that it was "mostly pointless" without being paired with the funny visuals of the show, and wished more songs had been written specifically for the characters. Thrust magazine expressed disdain that such a popular album was created by fictional recording artists, noting "Most people have to die before they sell so many records, but The Simpsons will never die. They don't exist". Commoner found it as an example of the rampant commercialization of The Simpsons in the early 90s.

Hatchet negatively compared it to the 1997 TV series soundtrack album Songs in the Key of Springfield, noting that the latter is "actually funny". Lambda felt the new album would be a "nice change" from the former, whose single “Do the Bartman” had become tiring.

Legacy
The Simpsons Sing the Blues is today regarded as a novelty from The Simpsons early popularity. Shortly after the record's release and success, record companies rushed to fashion music stars out of animated characters. In January 1991, Mattel announced plans to record a Barbie rock album titled The Look. At the same time, MCA Records was finishing work on an album based on the Mario Bros. characters. SBK and Geffen also enjoyed huge success with albums based on the film Teenage Mutant Ninja Turtles and The Simpsons Sing the Blues. The record soon became the fastest-selling album to emerge from a television show since the Miami Vice soundtrack in 1985. Disney also issued an album of Caribbean songs sung by The Little Mermaid's Sebastian as well as an album of songs sung by the cast of Dinosaurs, a series often compared to The Simpsons during its run. "Do the Bartman" inspired a dance, "The Bartman", that was popular in early 1991.

Track listing
 "Do the Bartman" (5:10) (written by Bryan Loren & Michael Jackson)
 Bart Simpson
 "School Day" (3:57) (originally written and performed by Chuck Berry)
 Bart Simpson
 Buster Poindexter
"Born Under a Bad Sign" (3:08) (originally performed by Albert King; written by Booker T. Jones and William Bell)
 Homer Simpson
 featuring B.B. King (guitar) and the horn section from Tower of Power
 "Moanin' Lisa Blues" (4:49) (written by John Boylan, Al Jean, Mike Reiss, Jai Winding)
 Lisa Simpson
 Homer Simpson (says "Lisa, KEEP IT DOWN!")
 featuring Joe Walsh (slide guitar), John Sebastian (harmonica) and the horn section from Tower of Power (horns)
 "Deep, Deep Trouble" (4:26) (Matt Groening, DJ Jazzy Jeff)
 Bart Simpson
 Homer Simpson
 featuring DJ Jazzy Jeff (scratches) Rosemary Butler & Marcy Levy (background vocals: "nothing but trouble; deep, deep trouble")
 "God Bless the Child" (4:30) (originally performed by Billie Holiday; written by Billie Holiday and Arthur Herzog, Jr.)
Lisa Simpson
 featuring "Bleeding Gums" Murphy
 "I Love to See You Smile" (3:07) (originally by Randy Newman)
 Homer Simpson
 Marge Simpson
 featuring Dr. John (piano solo)
 "Springfield Soul Stew" (2:39) (based on "Memphis Soul Stew" by King Curtis)
  Marge Simpson
 "Look at All Those Idiots" (3:52) (Jeff Martin, Sam Simon, Jai Winding)
 Montgomery Burns (listed as J. Montgomery Burns on this album)
 Smithers
 "Sibling Rivalry" (4:40) (John Boylan, James L. Brooks, Jai Winding)
 Bart Simpson
 Lisa Simpson

Discography

Charts

Weekly charts

Year-end charts

Certifications

References

External links
 The Simpsons Discography (SNPP/The Simpsons Archive), as of March 19, 2007.

1990 debut albums
Geffen Records albums
The Simpsons albums
Albums produced by John Boylan (record producer)
Blues albums by American artists
Albums produced by Michael Jackson
Albums with cover art by Matt Groening